Nawabzada Malik Ahmad Khan , or simply Malik Ahmad Khan is the former Minister of State for Foreign Affairs and member of Majlis-e-Shoora from 2008 to 2013. He was one of the youngest members of the Cabinet of Pakistan.

Early years

Malik Amad Awan's grandfather Malik Amir Muhammad Khan, of Kalabagh was the Governor of West Pakistan from 1960 to 1966. His uncles Malik Muzaffar Khan and Malik Allah Yar have been, and his cousin Sumaira Malik is still a member of the Pakistani parliament, his mother was from the royal family of Hunza. Having completed his secondary education in Islamabad, Khan enrolled in Pakistan Military Academy in Kakul, graduating from the school in 1992. He was then commissioned in the 26th Cavalry of Pakistan Army Armoured Corps Regiment. He resigned his commission in 1999.

Political career

In February 2008, he ran as an independent and was elected to the Majlis-e-Shoora (the Pakistani Parliament) from his home constituency in Mianwali, NA-71, Mainwali-I with 83,098 votes. He later joined the Pakistan Peoples Party because of its progressive agenda. After starting his term, Malik Amad Khan has been a member of three parliamentary committees: Standing Committee on Public Accounts, Standing Committee, Standing Committee on Information & Broadcasting, and Standing Committee on Kashmir Affairs & Northern Areas. He served as the Minister of State for Foreign Affairs from November 8, 2008, to March 25, 2013.

See also

Ministry of Foreign Affairs of Pakistan
Majlis-e-Shoora

References

1973 births
Living people
Pakistan People's Party politicians
People from Mianwali District
Punjabi people
Pakistani landowners
Pakistani royalty
Pakistani MNAs 2008–2013